Joe Towns, Jr. (born in Memphis, Tennessee) is an American politician and a Democratic member of the Tennessee House of Representatives representing District 84 since January 1995.

Education
Towns earned his BA in political science from LeMoyne–Owen College and his MS from the University of Arkansas.

Elections
2012 Towns was challenged in the August 2, 2012 Democratic Primary, winning with 4,082 votes (81.6%), and was unopposed for the November 6, 2012 General election, winning with 19,389 votes.
1994 Towns was initially elected in the November 8, 1994 General election.
1996 Towns was challenged in the 1996 Democratic Primary and was unopposed for the November 5, 1996 General election.
1998 Towns was challenged in the August 6, 1998 Democratic Primary, winning with 3,621 votes (63.9%), and was unopposed for the November 3, 1998 General election, winning with 6,781 votes.
2000 Towns was challenged in the August 3, 2000 Democratic Primary, winning with 2,430 votes (67.3%), and was unopposed for the November 7, 2000 General election, winning with 11,947 votes.
2002 Towns was unopposed for the August 1, 2002 Democratic Primary, winning with 7,567 votes, and won the November 5, 2002 General election, winning with 9,930 votes (86.1%) against Independent candidate C. C. Buchanan.
2004 Towns was unopposed for both the August 5, 2004 Democratic Primary, winning with 2,955 votes, and the November 2, 2004 General election, winning with 16,911 votes.
2006 Towns was challenged by his returning 1996 primary opponent in the August 3, 2006 Democratic Primary, winning with 5,153 votes (73.2%), and was unopposed for the November 7, 2006 General election, winning with 13,155 votes.
2008 Towns was unopposed for both the August 7, 2008 Democratic Primary, winning with 4,573 votes, and the November 4, 2008 General election, winning with 17,293 votes.
2010 Towns was challenged in the August 5, 2010 Democratic Primary, winning with 6,381 votes (85.9%), and was unopposed for the November 2, 2010 General election with 10,596 votes.

References

External links
Official page at the Tennessee General Assembly

Joe Towns, Jr. at Ballotpedia
Joe Towns, Jr. at the National Institute on Money in State Politics

Year of birth missing (living people)
Living people
African-American state legislators in Tennessee
LeMoyne–Owen College alumni
Democratic Party members of the Tennessee House of Representatives
Politicians from Memphis, Tennessee
University of Arkansas alumni
21st-century American politicians
21st-century African-American politicians